The South African Railways Class 19D 4-8-2 of 1937 was a steam locomotive.

Between 1937 and 1949, the South African Railways placed 235 Class 19D steam locomotives with a 4-8-2 Mountain type wheel arrangement in service. Between 1951 and 1955, 33 more were built for other operators like the Rhodesia and Angolan railways and the Nkana and Wankie mines, which makes the Class 19D the most numerous South African steam locomotive type ever built.

Manufacturers

The Class 19D 4-8-2 steam locomotive was the final development of the Class 19 family of locomotives. At the request of Colonel F.R. Collins, Chief Mechanical Engineer (CME) of the South African Railways (SAR) from 1922 to 1929, the original basic design of the Class 19 was done in the late 1920s by Test Engineer M.M. Loubser, who was himself later to serve as the CME from 1939 to 1949.

The final development of the Class was done in 1937 by W.A.J. Day, CME from 1936 to 1939. The Class 19D was a revised version of the Class 19C with piston valves and Walschaerts valve gear instead of rotary cam poppet valve gear.

Between 1937 and 1955, 268 Class 19D locomotives were built in seven batches by six locomotive manufacturers in Czechoslovakia, Germany and the United Kingdom and delivered to the SAR and several other operators in Southern Africa.
 The first forty were built in Germany in 1937, twenty with domeless boilers by Friedrich Krupp in Essen and numbered in the range from 2506 to 2525, and twenty by the Borsig Lokomotiv Werke in Hennigsdorf, Berlin and numbered in the range from 2526 to 2545.
 In 1938, a further 95 locomotives were ordered, built by three manufacturers. Škoda Works in Czechoslovakia built fifteen numbered in the range from 2626 to 2640, Krupp built forty, this time with domed boilers and numbered in the range from 2641 to 2680, and Borsig built forty numbered in the range from 2681 to 2720.
 Locomotive building was interrupted by World War II and post-war locomotive procurement saw European suppliers being replaced by British ones. In 1947, the first fifty post-war Class 19D locomotives were delivered by Robert Stephenson & Hawthorns (RSH) of Darlington, England and numbered in the range from 2721 to 2770. Of this order, engine no. 2734, RSH works no. 7247, was lost at sea off the east coast of England. Its replacement with RSH works number 7360 was paid for by insurance and it was given the number 2734 of the lost locomotive.
 The final batch of fifty Class 19D locomotives for the SAR were delivered in 1949 by the North British Locomotive Company (NBL) of Glasgow, Scotland and numbered in the range from 3321 to 3370. These engines were delivered with Type MX Torpedo tenders.
 In 1951, six were built by NBL for the Caminho de Ferro de Benguela (CFB) in Angola.
 Between 1951 and 1953, Henschel & Son built 21 more for the Rhodesia Railways (RR) and the Nkana copper mine in Northern Rhodesia.
 In 1955, four more were built by NBL for the Wankie coal mine in Southern Rhodesia.

Characteristics
The Class 19D, nicknamed Dolly, was very similar to its predecessor Class 19C, but Day specified piston valves and Walschaerts valve gear instead of rotary cam poppet valve gear. The cylinders were redesigned with straighter steam ports while the valve gear itself was revamped with a longer steam lap and greater valve travel. In all other respects they were identical to the Class 19C. The last five locomotives of the first batch from Krupp, numbers 2521 to 2525, were fitted with exhaust steam injectors.

The cylinders were of the combined type, being cast in two identical and interchangeable sections, each made up of one cylinder and half of the smokebox saddle. They were of cast iron and had liners fitted. The design of the steam passages provided for a large cross-sectional area for both live and exhaust steam.

All coupled wheels were flanged. The axle boxes of the leading and trailing wheels were equipped with roller bearings while the solid bronze coupled wheel axle boxes were soft grease-lubricated. Soft grease lubrication was used throughout for the motion gear, except the piston rods, valve spindles and main crossheads which were oil-lubricated. Two four-feed sight lubricators, arranged in the cab, supplied oil to the steam chests and cylinders.

Watson Standard boilers
The Class 19D was delivered with a Watson Standard no. 1A boiler, fitted with Ross Pop safety valves and set at  pressure. The regulator was of the multiple-valve type, with the valves arranged on the saturated steam side of the superheater header in accordance with SAR practice. The boiler was one of the range of standard type boilers which were designed by Day's predecessor as CME, A.G. Watson, as part of his standardisation policy. The locomotive was also equipped with a Watson cab with its distinctive inclined front.

Despite the specifications, the first batch of Class 19D locomotives, built by Krupp and Borsig and delivered in 1937 and 1938, came in two variations. The Krupp-built locomotives were delivered with domeless boilers, while the Borsig-built locomotives conformed to the specifications with domed boilers.

While the domeless boilers did not conform to the specified Watson Standard no. 1A boiler as far as the dome was concerned, they were accepted nevertheless, probably since all their other dimensions were identical to that of the Watson Standard boiler. It appears that Krupp had decided on their own accord that a dome was not necessary since there was no regulator in the dome, but merely a standpipe. Krupp substituted the dome with a manhole cover on which the two Pop safety valves were mounted, while the steam was collected through a battery of collecting pipes, situated high up in the boiler in a similar manner to that which was used in the Class 16E.

All the subsequent Class 19D orders were delivered with domed Watson Standard no. 1A boilers with the usual standpipe steam collector high up in the dome, from where steam was led to the multi-valve regulator in the smokebox. Technically, whenever the loading gauge permitted the use of domes, their use was preferable to the domeless system which resulted in crowding multiple pipes into the boiler and other complications better left out of boilers. Operationally, according to drivers, there was no apparent difference in locomotive performance between the two boiler types.

The Watson Standard boilers are interchangeable between locomotives. In the process of locomotives undergoing major overhauls, these twenty Krupp-built domeless boilers migrated between engines during subsequent years. As a result, locomotives from the other builders and even some Classes 19A and 19C locomotives eventually ended up with some of these domeless boilers.

Tenders
As a result of having been built over such a long time span by so many different manufacturers, the six main groups of the Class 19D all had different all-up weights and axle loadings, as shown in the table and the specifications in the infobox. Over the eleven years during which the Class 19D was being produced for the SAR, some alterations occurred.
Upon delivery, their new Type MT tenders were exchanged for the smaller modified Type MP1 tenders from some of the reboilered mainline locomotives. This policy was followed with all the Classes 19B, 19C and 19D, except the last batch of Class 19D for the SAR, numbers 3321 to 3370.
 During 1944 Dr. M.M. Loubser, then CME, who had been involved with the design of the Class 19 family from the very beginning in the late 1920s, made further improvements to the Class 19D. All the post-war locomotives came equipped with vacuum brake systems in addition to the steam brakes. The two  vacuum cylinders were fitted under the running boards on either side at a point about midway between the leading and driving coupled wheels, while the vacuum chamber was arranged in line with the intermediate coupled wheels.
 The final batch from NBL, numbers 3321 to 3370, had Type MX tank wagon type tenders with cylindrical water tanks, similar in appearance to the American Vanderbilt type tenders. They were built to the design of Dr. M.M. Loubser, ran on three-axle Buckeye bogies and became commonly known as Torpedo tenders.

Service

South African Railways
During the service life of the Class 19D, several tender exchanges occurred to best equip a locomotive for the region it was allocated to and the type of service it was to be employed in. In line service, type MX Torpedo tenders were usually preferred for their larger coal and water capacities. The result was that by the time the Class 19D was withdrawn from service in the late 1980s, many had exchanged their Type MP1 or Type MR tenders for Type MX Torpedo tenders and vice versa. Type MX Torpedo tenders also ended up attached to Class 19B and Class 19C locomotives.

The Class 19D was the most numerous South African branch line locomotive and, at 235 built for the SAR, was only twenty less in number than the Class 15F mainline locomotive, the most numerous South African steam class. The Class 19D was very versatile and saw main- and branch line service all over South Africa with the exception of the Western Cape, where the Class 19C was used.

Tasks varied from mainline local and international passenger trains on the section between Warrenton and Mafeking en route between South Africa and Northern Rhodesia via Bechuanaland and Southern Rhodesia, to secondary and branch line duties and in later years as shunting engines. On occasion, South African Class 19D locomotives worked through from Mafikeng in South Africa via Botswana all the way to Bulawayo in Zimbabwe. SAR Class 19D locomotives were also hired out for shunting work to the Rhodesia Railways for use at Beit Bridge and to Mozambique for use at Lourenco Marques.

From c. 1972, the new Union Carriage & Wagon-built Blue Train was stabled at Pretoria. After Capital Park's blue-liveried Class S2 no. 3793 was withdrawn along with the rest of its class in 1979–1980, the Pretoria station carriage-shunt duties were taken over by a blue-painted Class 19D no. 2749, the only member of the class to serve in a different SAR livery from the usual black. Apart from shunting work, the blue Dolly was often specially requested to work the Cullinan train during the Jacaranda season.

The Class 19D served until right at the end of the South African steam era and were amongst the last steam locomotives to be replaced by electric and diesel-electric traction.

Other operators
Other Southern African railways and some industries also purchased locomotives built to the Class 19D design. When these foreign versions are included, a total of 268 locomotives were built to the Class 19D design making them even more numerous than the Class 15F.

Benguela Railway
Six were built for the Caminho de Ferro de Benguela (CFB or Benguela Railway) in Angola by NBL in 1951, as their 11th Class and numbered in the range from 401 to 406. These locomotives were wood- or coal-fired, depending on where they were operating, and had tenders with slatted frames installed on top of the bunker to increase their fuel capacity when wood was used. In August 1972, for example, numbers 401, 402 and 406 were based at Lobito and were observed to be coal-fired. At the same time, numbers 403 and 405 were observed at Luso and no. 404 at Nova Lisboa, all wood-fired.

Rhodesia Railways
Between 1951 and 1953, Henschel & Son built twenty for Rhodesia Railways, their 19th class, numbered in the range from 316 to 335. They had tenders similar to the SAR Torpedo type, but with plate frame bogies instead of cast frame Buckeye bogies.

A single RR 19C class, no. 336, was built by Henschel in 1953 as a condensing locomotive. After a collision in 1956, it was rebuilt into a non-condensing 19th Class and re-entered service in 1958. The condensing tender was rebuilt to a Torpedo tender by mounting a tank and coal bunker, supplied locally in Bulawayo, on the frame. This rebuilt tender is the one paired with no. 330 which is preserved in the Bulawayo Railway Museum.

By June 1975, only three were left in service, all allocated to the Bulawayo shed, but with two out-stationed at Mafeking in South Africa.

Nkana Mines
Two were built by Henschel for the Nkana copper mines in Northern Rhodesia in 1952, numbered 107 and 108. In 1967, they were sold to a Rhodesian scrap merchant who, in turn, sold them to Rhodesia Railways where they were overhauled and placed back in service in 1968 as RR 19B Class no. 337 and 338.

Wankie Colliery
In 1955 four more without superheating and numbered in the range from 1 to 4 were built to the design of the Class 19D by NBL for the Wankie Colliery in Southern Rhodesia.

Industrial
As they were being retired, several Class 19D locomotives were sold into industrial service. By the late 1980s, some of them were already at work at Dunn's, Saiccor, Loraine Gold Mine and Bamangwato Concessions Ltd. (BCL) in Botswana, and more were to follow.

As late as 2011, two Class 19Ds which had been used on the Vaal Reefs Gold Mine in the 1980s until they were retired and dumped at Jan Kempdorp where they stood unprotected for about twenty years, were bought by BCL Selebi-Phikwe. The locomotives, possibly numbers 2678 and 2689, were to be overhauled for use by the mine there, which was still operating ex-SAR Class 19D and ex-RR 19th class locomotives. By June 2012, the first of these two was put into service. However the mine closed in late 2016 putting the entire fleet out of work and now up for sale (December 2018).

Red Devil predecessor
As a trial run before SAR mechanical engineer David Wardale was granted permission to proceed to rebuild a Class 25NC  locomotive to the Class 26 Red Devil in 1979, he was allowed to carry out modifications to a Class 19D locomotive. The locomotive selected for the experiment was Krupp-built no. 2644, a particularly poor-steaming member of the Class at the time.

A gas producer combustion system (GPCS) and dual Lempor exhaust were installed, along with some other small improvements. The Lempor had a four-jet blastpipe with extended petticoats to provide truer ejector proportions. Steam flow in the cylinders was improved by streamlining the edges of the piston valves which were each equipped with an additional valve ring to reduce leakage. The firebox was modified to the GPCS system wherein principal combustion is effected using secondary air introduced above the firebed through ducts in the firebox sides, while primary air was restricted through dampers and a redesigned grate.

Firebox turbulence was created by steam jets and clinkering was inhibited by introducing exhaust steam under the grate. Sanding was improved and de-sanding jets were installed to clean the rails after the locomotive had passed.

The modifications improved the locomotive's steaming rate and enabled it to achieve significantly higher power and significantly lower fuel consumption than other unmodified Class 19D locomotives, the coal savings and increased output being in the order of 20% to 25%. The success of this experiment convinced the SAR management at the time of the viability of the project which culminated in the Class 26 Red Devil.

Preservation

Of the Class 19D, several survived into preservation. By 2018

Works numbers and renumbering
The table shows the Class 19D builders, works numbers, years built and engine numbers. Batch code symbols for the weight specifications as defined in the infobox are included in the "Notes" column.

References

External links

Borsig locomotives
Cape gauge railway locomotives
Henschel locomotives
Krupp locomotives
NBL locomotives
Railway locomotives introduced in 1937
Robert Stephenson and Hawthorns locomotives
Škoda locomotives
Steam locomotives of South Africa
Steam locomotives of Zimbabwe
2020
2020
2D1 locomotives
4-8-2 locomotives